Chialingosaurus (meaning "Chialing Lizard") is a genus of herbivorous stegosaurian dinosaur similar to Kentrosaurus from the Upper Shaximiao Formation, Late Jurassic beds in Sichuan Province in China. Its age makes it one of the oldest species of stegosaurs, living about 160 million years ago.  Since it was an herbivore, scientists think that Chialingosaurus probably ate ferns and cycads, which were plentiful during the period when Chialingosaurus was alive.

Discovery and species
The fossils of Chialingosaurus were collected by the geologist Kuan Yaowu or Guan Yao-Wu in 1957, at Taipingstai in Quxian County, while surveying the Chialing River in southern China. The type species Chialingosaurus kuani was named and described by paleontologist Yang Zhongjian, ("C. C. Young") two years later in 1959. The generic name refers to the Chialing. The specific name honours Kuan. Chialingosaurus was the first stegosaurian described from China.

The holotype, IVPP 2300, was found in a layer of the Upper Shaximiao Formation, dating from the Oxfordian-Kimmeridgian. It consists of a partial skeleton lacking the skull. It contains six vertebrae, the coracoids, the humeri, a right radius and three spines. The original material has been supplemented after November 1978 by Zhou Shiwu of the Municipal Museum of Chongqing. A second specimen, CV 202, was referred. It represents a skeleton with a partial skull and lower jaws, some vertebrae and limb elements, and four plates. Zhou considered it likely that the holotype and CV 202 represented a single individual, as the material was not overlapping. A third specimen, CV 203, a partial skeleton lacking the skull, was made the paratype. All specimens are juvenile or subadult.

In 1999, Li Kui, Zhang Yuguang and Cai Kaiji mentioned a second species: Chialingosaurus guangyuanensis. A description was not provided, however, and the name is seen as a nomen nudum.

Description
 
Yang in 1959 provided a diagnosis, emphasising the slender build of the animal. It might have been only four metres (thirteen feet) long. However, the gracile proportions may have been caused by the subadult age and the remainder of the diagnostic traits were in fact shared by other stegosaurs. In 1990, Peter Malcolm Galton identified just a single autapomorphy: the lesser trochanter of the thighbone is triangular with a broad base. Susannah Maidment in 2008 even listed Chialingosaurus kuani among the invalid stegosaur taxa in her phylogeny of Stegosauria. This was based upon previous work by Maidment & Wei in 2006 in which the authors were unable to identify any autapomorphies or unique character combinations for Chialingosaurus, therefore making it a nomen dubium.
Yang modelled Chialingosaurus after Kentrosaurus. Some plates and spine bases having been found, he suggested that the plates were placed on the front upper parts of the animal, the spines at the hip and tail.

Phylogeny
Yang in 1959 placed Chialingosaurus in the Stegosaurinae within the Stegosauridae. In 1969, Rodney Steel suggested that Chialingosaurus might have actually been an early ancestor of other stegosaurs. However, Galton in 2004 recovered a rather derived position, albeit indeed close to Kentrosaurus. Dong confirmed the placement in the Stegosaurinae.

See also

 Timeline of stegosaur research

Sources

Notes

Late Jurassic dinosaurs of Asia
Stegosaurs
Fossil taxa described in 1959
Taxa named by Yang Zhongjian
Paleontology in Sichuan
Nomina dubia
Ornithischian genera